Sri Ranjit Maharaj (4 January 1913 – 15 November 2000) was an Indian spiritual teacher in the Navnath Inchegeri Sampradaya tradition, and disciple of Siddharameshwar Maharaj.

Biography
Ranjit Maharaj was born on 4 January, 1913. His father died when he was 6 years old. In 1924, he met Siddharameshwar Maharaj. The following year he was initiated by Siddharameshwar Maharaj. In 1934, at the age of 21, he got initiated into monkhood. Only in 1983, at the age of 70, he initiated his first disciple, Shri Siddharameshwar Maharaj's granddaughter-in-law. Hereafter, he started to attract an international following. In 1996, he was invited to visit Germany, France and USA. In the following years, he visited these countries several times, and also the UK, Switzerland and Spain also, until 2000, when he died.

Inchegeri Sampradaya
Ranjit Maharaj belongs to the Inchegiri Sampradaya, a lineage of teachers belonging to the Navnath tradition. Ranjit was responsible for instigating the translation, printing and publication into the English language of the spiritual classic, "Master of Self Realization" (Adhyatma Dnyanacha Yogeshwar), that are the utterances of His Guru Siddharameshwar Maharaj. These utterances had been recorded by Ranjit's fellow devotee Nisargadatta Maharaj before Nisargadatta's realization.

Publications
 The Way Of The Bird
 Illusion v. Reality (2011), Sadguru Publishing. .
 My Masters voice : Edited by Linda Flames, Compiled by : Murli Raghvan and Translated by Sachin Kshirsagar , Marathi Version Name : Mazya Sadgurunchi Amrutwani

References

External links
 Sadguru.com, website dedicated to Ranjit Maharaj
 Ranjit Interview
 YouTube, Ranjit Maharaj: The Shortest Way to Enlightenment
 Inchegiri Navnath Sampradaya Masters on Telegram

Inchegeri Sampradaya
Indian Hindu spiritual teachers
1913 births
2000 deaths
Indian Hindu monks
Advaitin philosophers
Marathi Hindu saints